Claudia Bandion-Ortner (born 30 November 1966) is an Austrian judge and politician, who served as the minister of justice.

Early life and education
Bandion-Ortner was born in Graz on 30 November 1966. She graduated from Karl-Franzens University in Graz in 1989 with a master's degree in law.

Career
Bandion-Ortner began her career as a judge at the regional court for criminal matters in Vienna. Then she became a chief judge. She was appointed minister of justice to the coalition cabinet led by Werner Faymann on 15 January 2009, replacing Johannes Hahn. Although she was an independent figure, the People's Party, partner of the Social Democratic Party in the coalition, nominated her for the post. Her tenure lasted until 20 April 2011 when she was resigned from office and she was succeeded by Beatrix Karl in the post.

After leaving office Bandion-Ortner served as the senior advisor at the international anticorruption academy in Laxenburg, outside Vienna,  from August 2011 to August 2012. In November 2012, Bandion-Ortner was appointed deputy secretary-general of the King Abdullah bin Abdulaziz international centre for interreligious and intercultural dialogue (KAICIID) that is based in Vienna.

Personal life
Bandion-Ortner is married and has a child.

References

1966 births
Austrian women judges
Living people
Politicians from Graz
University of Graz alumni
Women government ministers of Austria
21st-century Austrian women politicians
21st-century Austrian politicians
Female justice ministers
Justice ministers of Austria